Exidia nigricans (common name Witches' butter) is a jelly fungus in the family Auriculariaceae. It is a common, wood-rotting species throughout the northern hemisphere, typically growing on dead attached branches of broadleaf trees. It has been much confused with Exidia glandulosa.

Taxonomy 
The species was originally described from England as Tremella nigricans by Withering in 1776, based on a phrase name published by Dillenius in 1741. It was subsequently considered a synonym of Exidia glandulosa, until Donk revised species concepts in 1966 and placed it in synonymy with Exidia plana. Changes in the starting point for fungal nomenclature has made Exidia plana illegitimate, however, leaving Exidia nigricans as the earliest name for the species.

Molecular research has shown that Exidia glandulosa and E. nigricans, though similar, are distinct.

Witches' butter 
Both Dillenius (1741) and Withering (1776) gave the English name for this species as "Witches' butter", though this name has subsequently also been applied to other gelatinous fungi, including Exidia glandulosa and the yellow Tremella mesenterica. It is said to be based on a folk belief that witches milk cows at night and scatter the butter they create in the process around.

Description 
The fruitbodies occur in clusters and quickly coalesce to form effused, irregular masses  or more across. The upper, spore-bearing surface is shiny and dotted with small pimples or pegs. The individual fruitbodies are each attached to the wood at the base. The spore print is white.

Microscopic characters 
The microscopic characters are typical of the genus Exidia. The basidia are ellipsoid, septate, 15-25 × 8-13 µm. The spores are allantoid (sausage-shaped), 14-19 × 4.5-5.5 µm.

Similar species 

Exidia nigricans and E. glandulosa are frequently confused. The two are similar, but E. glandulosa produces discrete, top-shaped fruitbodies that rarely if ever coalesce. They are indistinguishable microscopically, but DNA research indicates they are distinct.

Tremella foliacea is usually a warmer, lighter brown, but can sometimes be dark sepia to black. Its fruitbodies are gelatinous, but usually foliaceous (with flattish lobes or fronds) and never have warts or pegs on the surface. It is common and occurs on both broadleaf trees and conifers.

Habitat and distribution 
Exidia nigricans is a wood-rotting species, typically found on dead attached branches of a wide range of broadleaf trees. It persists for some while on fallen branches and logs. The species typically fruits in autumn and winter. It is widely distributed in the northern hemisphere, including North America and Europe.

References

External links 

Auriculariales
Fungi of Europe
Fungi of North America